Lafayette Monroe Sturdevant (September 17, 1856 – August 25, 1923) was a Wisconsin lawyer and  politician.

Born in Chandlers Valley, Pennsylvania in Warren County, Sturdevant and his family settled in Clark County, Wisconsin. There, Sturdevant taught school and studied law. After being admitted to the Wisconsin bar in 1878, he practiced law and was elected District Attorney of Clark County. In 1899–1903, he served in the Wisconsin State Assembly and was Wisconsin Attorney General from 1903–1907. After serving as private counsel to Wisconsin Governor James O. Davidson, Sturdevant resumed his law practice. Sturdevant died suddenly in a hospital in Quincy, Illinois while visiting family and friends.

Notes

External links
Clark County, Wisconsin History-Lafayette M. Sturdevant

People from Warren County, Pennsylvania
People from Clark County, Wisconsin
Members of the Wisconsin State Assembly
Wisconsin Attorneys General
District attorneys in Wisconsin
1856 births
1923 deaths